Denis William Arthur Vann (21 November 1916 – 20 January 1961) was an English cricketer.  Vann was a right-handed batsman whose bowling style is unknown.  He was born at Northampton, Northamptonshire.

Vann made his first-class debut for Northamptonshire against Warwickshire in the 1936 County Championship.  He made three further first-class appearances for the county the following season against Nottinghamshire, Cambridge University and Worcestershire.  In his four first-class matches, he scored 47 runs at an average of 7.83, with a high score of 16.  With the ball, he took 2 wickets at a bowling average of 52.00, with best figures of 2/26.

He died at Kettering, Northamptonshire on 20 January 1961.

References

External links
Denis Vann at ESPNcricinfo
Denis Vann at CricketArchive

1916 births
1961 deaths
Cricketers from Northampton
English cricketers
Northamptonshire cricketers